Indirect presidential elections were held in South Korea on 27 August 1980 to fill the vacancy caused by President Choi Kyu-hah's resignation. 

Under the 1972 Yushin Constitution, the president was elected by the National Conference for Unification, whose 2,540 members had been elected for a six-year term of office in December 1978. General Chun Doo-hwan was the only candidate, and was elected unopposed.

Chun was to serve for the remainder of the 1978–1984 term of longtime president Park Chung-hee, who had died in 1979 and been replaced by Choi. However, Chun subsequently decided to stage a coup and end the Fourth Republic and draft a new constitution, which was promulgated in October 1980 after being approved in a referendum. The first presidential election under the new constitution was held in February 1981, and Chun was elected by an overwhelming majority under controversial circumstances.

Background 
After the assassination of the military dictator President Park Chung-hee in October 1979, Prime Minister Choi Kyu-hah was elected president in the December 1979 elections. However, General Chun Doo-hwan staged the Coup d'état of December Twelfth and effectively took control of the government, making President Choi a figurehead. However, on 16 August 1980, following the Coup d'état of May Seventeenth, Chun removed Choi from office so he could become president himself.

Results
In order to be elected, a candidate had to receive the vote of over 50% of the incumbent members of the National Conference for Unification. With 2,540 delegates present, Chun had to receive at least 1,271 votes to be elected. He received 2,524 votes, 99.37% of the total possible.

Electors per region

References

Presidential elections in South Korea
1980 elections in South Korea